Darin McFadyen, better known by his stage name FreQ Nasty, is a DJ and producer of breakbeat electronic music, currently based in Los Angeles, California, United States. Originally from New Zealand, McFadyen's artistic career has taken him across the world, first as a resident in London's Fabric Nightclub, to multiple tours in Europe and Australia. He currently resides in the United States, where he has become a fixture amongst North American art and music festivals, most notably Burning Man.

Background
Born in Fiji, McFadyen spent his childhood in New Zealand, where his appreciation for music began at an early age. He credits his parents for his introduction to many different genres, most notably blues, jazz, and Polynesian styles of music. He also acknowledges to being an ardent fan of the Beatles during his adolescence. While in school he learned how to play guitar and drums, which he played in various bands. Soon after his early exposure to writing music, he began to DJ and produce his own style of electronic music, drawing upon the influences of artists such as Funkadelic, Billy Boyo and the Greensleeves, and Public Enemy. Aside from his pursuits as a musician, McFadyen has also been a longtime practitioner of yoga and Buddhism. Having practiced yoga since 1999 with the Satyananda lineage in London, he has also studied yoga and Buddhism with Buddhist monk and Professor of Comparative Religion Venerable Sumati Marut since 2007. McFadyen was married to Gabriela Valentina Ocampo on 15 December 2018.

Production career
FreQ Nasty has widely been considered a pioneer in breakbeat music since the genre's initial rise in popularity. FreQ Nasty began his career in 1998 on the UK label Botchit & Scarper, where he forged his sound of ragga, hip-hop, dancehall, and heavy basslines at the apex London's 1990s dance music revolution. Of his early releases, the singles "Boomin Back Atcha" and "Move Back" quickly became classics within the breaks genre. In 2003, he moved to Skint Records, where he went on to release a list of top records, collaborating with and remixing a diverse range of artists including Fatboy Slim, Kelis, KRS-One, Roots Manuva, Rodney P, Bassnectar, Tipper, and reggae legend Junior Delgado. 2008 saw the release of "Creator", his crossover hit collaboration with Santigold, producer Switch and New York City lyricist Santogold, and the Fabric Live 42 mix CD, which was picked as DJ Magazine's compilation of the month. In early 2011 he released "Dread at the Controls" under California label Muti Music, which subsequently launched the seventeen-city "Monsters of Bass" tour. In that following December, FreQ's "Low FreQuency Pureland EP" was released, earning DJ Magazine's selection as the MoneyShot release for December, receiving a 10 out of 10 rating.

Activism and side projects
Alongside his career as an established music producer, FreQ Nasty is also known for his engagement as a social activist. In early 2008, he launched Giveback.net, a socially conscious website in which musicians donate music in support of non-profit "action campaigns" via music campaigns featured on the site. The first campaign, in support of the Tibetan People's Uprising Movement, featured a collaboration with Bassnectar on the single "Viva Tibet". FreQ Nasty has been a vocal advocate for musicians reaching out to support social issues, to which he is quoted:

FreQ Nasty also collaborated with San Francisco-based Heavyweight Dub Champion, remixing the group's "Snared" single in support of The World Family's creation of an irrigation system in the village of Gara Dima, Ethiopia. A similar collaboration was completed with singer-songwriter Michael Franti, in which Franti's single "The Future" was remixed in support of a Bay Area nonprofit to help create a music studio for at-risk youth in San Francisco's Bayview-Hunters Point district. FreQ's current side projects include the Dub Kirtan All Stars, a live 10 piece band of singers and musicians formed with producer David Starfire, and The Yoga of Bass, a series of talks given with yoga teacher Claire Thompson, both of which seek to open up the Yoga tradition to underground dance music club audiences.

Discography

Albums
 Freq's, Geeks & Mutilations (1999), Botchit & Scarper Records
 Bring Me the Head of Freq Nasty (2003), Skint Records

Singles and EPs
 Underglass (1997), Botchit & Scarper Records
 Freqazoid (1997), Botchit & Scarper Records
 FreQ Nasty feat. Phoebe One - Boomin' Back Atcha (1999), Botchit & Scarper Records
 Move Back (1999), Botchit & Scarper Records
 Tipper / FreQ Nasty & DJ Dee Kline - Electric Kingdom Vol.2, Part 1 (2000), Electric Kingdom (US)
 Fresh / One More Time (2001), Skint Records
 Transforma / Amped (2001), Skint Records
 That's My Style (2001), Skint Records
 DJ Dee Kline vs. FreQ Nasty - Every Posse & Crew (2002), Rat Records
 FreQ Nasty feat. Rodney P - Come Let Me Know (2003), Skint Records
 Punkadelic (2004), Skint Records
 Sil Num Tao (2004), Skint Records
 Brooklyn To Brixton (2004), Skint Records
 Mad Situation feat. Junior Delgado (2005), Skint Records
 FreQ Nasty vs. Bassnectar - Viva Tibet (2008) (Produced with Bassnectar, this song was released exclusively on Giveback.net in support of their "March to Tibet" action campaign.)
 Dread at the Controls (2011), Muti Music
 Warm Dark Place (Eyes on the Prize) (2011)
 Low FreQuency Pureland (2011), FreQ Nasty Recordings
 Bon Merde (2012), High Chai
 Dread At The Controls Remixed (2012), Muti Music

DJ mixes
 Y4K: Next Level Breaks (2002), Distinctive Breaks Records
 Breakspoll Presents: Vol.2 (2006), Super Charged
 Fabric Live 42 (2008), Fabric

References

External links
 Official Freq Nasty Website
  - and/or - 
 Freq Nasty Mix "1000 Buddhas Of The Pureland Of Bass" on Urb, 6 December 2011

New Zealand expatriates in the United States
American DJs
American electronic musicians
Breakbeat musicians
Dubstep musicians
Remixers
Ableton Live users
Living people
1969 births
Electronic dance music DJs